In mathematics, the Segre embedding is used in projective geometry to consider the cartesian product (of sets) of two projective spaces as a projective variety. It is named after Corrado Segre.

Definition
The Segre map may be defined as the map

taking a pair of points  to their product

(the XiYj are taken in lexicographical order).

is that of homogeneous coordinates on the space. The image of the map is a variety, called a Segre variety.

Discussion
In the language of linear algebra, for given vector spaces U and V over the same field K, there is a natural way to map their cartesian product to their tensor product.

 

 

Considering the underlying projective spaces P(U) and P(V), this mapping becomes a morphism of varieties

 

This is not only injective in the set-theoretic sense: it is a closed immersion in the sense of algebraic geometry. That is, one can give a set of equations for the image. Except for notational trouble, it is easy to say what such equations are: they express two ways of factoring products of coordinates from the tensor product, obtained in two different ways as something from U times something from V.

This mapping or morphism σ is the Segre embedding. Counting dimensions, it shows how the product of projective spaces of dimensions m and n embeds in dimension

Classical terminology calls the coordinates on the product multihomogeneous, and the product generalised to k factors k-way projective space.

Properties
The Segre variety is an example of a determinantal variety; it is the zero locus of the 2×2 minors of the matrix .  That is, the Segre variety is the common zero locus of the quadratic polynomials

Here,  is understood to be the natural coordinate on the image of the Segre map.
 
The projection

to the first factor can be specified by m+1 maps on open subsets covering the Segre variety, which agree on intersections of the subsets. The equations  ensure that these maps agree with each other, because if  we have .

The fibers of the product are linear subspaces. That is, let

be the projection to the first factor; and likewise  for the second factor. Then the image of the map

for a fixed point p is a linear subspace of the codomain.

Examples

Quadric
For example with m = n = 1 we get an embedding of the product of the projective line with itself in P3. The image is a quadric, and is easily seen to contain two one-parameter families of lines. Over the complex numbers this is a quite general non-singular quadric. Letting

be the homogeneous coordinates on P3, this quadric is given as the zero locus of the quadratic polynomial given by the determinant

Segre threefold
The map

is known as the Segre threefold. It is an example of a rational normal scroll.  The intersection of the Segre threefold and a three-plane  is a twisted cubic curve.

Veronese variety
The image of the diagonal  under the Segre map is the Veronese variety of degree two

Applications
Because the Segre map is to the categorical product of projective spaces, it is a natural mapping for describing non-entangled states in quantum mechanics and quantum information theory. More precisely, the Segre map describes how to take products of projective Hilbert spaces.

In algebraic statistics, Segre varieties correspond to independence models.

The Segre embedding of P2×P2 in P8 is the only Severi variety of dimension 4.

References

 
 

Algebraic varieties
Projective geometry